The Joss JP1 is a test prototype sports car developed by Joss Developments which never made production.

The first test vehicle, known as the JT1, was designed, engineered and subsequently launched in 2004. It was shown to the public at the Melbourne, Adelaide and Sydney Motorshows to critical acclaim, and established the company as a serious supercar operation.

The Joss JT1 can be seen in the Xbox 360 video games PGR3 and PGR4 (although at that point no actual road-going car existed), as well as in Forza Motorsport 3, Forza Motorsport 4, and Forza Horizon.

Following feedback, additional external investment and other technological developments, the company embarked upon their mid-engined production version, internally code-named the Joss JP1. Production was set for 2013 with 25 produced each year at a price above $500,000. After investment ended in 2014, attempts were made to scale down to a race car version to compete in Targa Tasmania using crowdfunding.

As of December 2016, the JT1 is listed for sale on the carsales.com.au website.

Design
Joss Developments Limited was founded by Technical Director Matthew Thomas, an automotive designer who has worked for many years around the world for companies such as Stewart Grand Prix, Bentley, Jaguar, and Aston Martin.

The early version of supercar, the JT1, had only one colour, being somewhat close to a sky blue, though the car has been photographed with its production team in white. The revised JP-1 has been seen in a number of colours as the team run through the vehicle's development.

Joss JP1

Performance Claims 
0–100 km/h (0-62 mph): sub 3.0s
0–400 m (quarter mile): 11.7s
Top Speed: 340+ km/h (211 mph)

Engine/Drivetrain
 All aluminium V8 DOHC, fuel injected
 Joss/Albins bespoke transaxle

General Data
Wheelbase: 
Length: 
Width: 
Height: 
Ground clearance: 
Frontal area: 1.8m2
Curb weight:

Joss JT1

Performance Claims 
0–100 km/h (0-62 mph): 3.0s
0–400 m (quarter mile): 11.9 seconds @ 
Top Speed:  (estimated)

Engine/Drivetrain
 6.8L all-alloy fuel injected 16V V8
 5 speed manual (Porsche G50), triple plate clutch

General Data
Wheelbase: 
Length: 
Width: 
Height: 
Ground clearance: 
Frontal area: 1.6m2
Curb weight:

References

External links
Kickstarter site
Joss Supercar Nearing Debut
2004 Custom Race Car Joss JT1 Manual for sale

Cars of Australia
Cars introduced in 2004
Sports cars
Coupés
Rear mid-engine, rear-wheel-drive vehicles